Taken is a Canadian true crime documentary television series produced by Winnipeg-based production company Eagle Vision. It first aired on the Aboriginal People’s Television Network on September 9, 2016 and was broadcast again later that year by the CBC. The series features reenactments and interviews with the family and friends of Canada's Missing and Murdered Indigenous Women and Girls, as well as interviews with local and federal law enforcement, various Canadian experts, advocates, activists and politicians who provide social commentary on the issue of MMIWG in Canada. The series also encourages viewers with information about the featured cases to call the RCMP or Canadian Crime Stoppers anonymous toll-free tip line at 1-800-222-8477. The series was created by Lisa Meeches, Kyle Irving and Rebecca Gibson and is broadcast in both English with host Lisa Meeches, and in Cree by host George Muswaggon. There are currently 3 seasons of Taken, with a fourth and final season in development.

Episodes

Season 1 (2016)

Season 2 (2017) 

Season 3 (2018)

Ratings 
Season 1 of the series is estimated to have reached an average of 100,000 viewers in its initial airing, increasing to 1.4 million after its release on CBC.

Awards and nominations 
 Nomination: 6th Canadian Screen Awards (Factual Program or Series), (Editorial Research - Rebecca Gibson, Bernadette Smith, Madison Thomas, "Tina Fontaine")
 Winner: 2017 Accolade Global Film Competition Award of Merit (Rebecca Gibson, Eagle Vision (Canada), TAKEN – Emily Osmond, Television – Program / Series)
 Winner: 2017 Beyond Borders ECPAT Canadian Media Awards (English Electronic: Rebecca Gibson, Kyle Irving, Lisa Meeches, Jacquie Black Taken – Cherisse Houle   APTN, CBC)

References

External links
 
 

Aboriginal Peoples Television Network original programming
2016 Canadian television series debuts
2010s Canadian documentary television series
CBC Television original programming
Missing and Murdered Indigenous Women and Girls movement
First Nations television series